Samuel Giacosa (born August 1905, date of death unknown) was an Argentine sprinter. He competed in the men's 100 metres at the 1932 Summer Olympics.

References

External links
 

1905 births
Year of death missing
Athletes (track and field) at the 1932 Summer Olympics
Argentine male sprinters
Olympic athletes of Argentina
Place of birth missing
20th-century Argentine people